Eanna-shum-iddina was a governor in the Sealand Dynasty of Babylon in the middle of the second millennium BC. Sealand was the region of southern Iraq, of the Tigris-Euphrates-(Mesopotamia) along the coast. Eanna-shum-iddina is known to have made at least one Kudurru boundary stone.

The "Eanna-shum-iddina kudurru" was a land grant to Gula-eresh, witnessed by his surveyor Amurru-bel-zeri.

The British Museum dates this kudurru to the period 1125-1100 BC.

See also
Eanna-shum-iddina kudurru
Kudurru

External links
Kudurru Image
Article of "Eanna-shum-iddina kudurru"
British Museum article

Babylonia
Babylonian kings